Parow can mean:

Places
Parow, Germany, a village in Mecklenburg-Vorpommern, Germany
Parow, Cape Town, a northern suburb of Cape Town, Western Cape, South Africa
For Captain Johann Heinrich Ferdinand Parow, founder of Parow, Cape Town
Parow Park, sports venue in Cape Town, South Africa

People
Jack Parow (born 1982), stage name of Zander Tyler, South African rapper

See also
Paro (disambiguation)
Para (disambiguation)
Parra (disambiguation)